Ghanem is a masculine given name and a surname. It may refer to:

Given name
 Ghanem al-Dosari (born 1980), Saudi human rights activist and satirist
 Ghanem Hamarsheh (born 1977), Jordanian retired footballer
 Ghanem Nuseibeh (born 1977), founder of Cornerstone Global Associates
 Ghanem Zrelly (born 1984), Tunisian actor

Surname
 Abdullah Ghanem (born 1995), Emirati footballer
 Antoine Ghanem (1943–2007), Lebanese politician
 Asma Ghanem (born 1991), Palestinian visual artist and musician
 Donia Samir Ghanem (born 1985), Egyptian singer and actress
 Iskandar Ghanem (1911–2005), Lebanese army general 
 Marcel Ghanem (born 1964), Lebanese journalist
 Najwa Ghanem (born c. 1960), Syrian first wife and first cousin of Osama bin Laden
 Ola Ghanem (born 1971), Egyptian actress
 Robert Ghanem (1942–2019), Lebanese lawyer and politician
 Sabine Ghanem (born 1984), Swiss-Lebanese jewelry designer and socialite
 Samir Ghanem (1937–2021), Egyptian comedian
 Saoud Ghanem (born 1981), Kuwaiti-born Qatari former international footballer
 Shihab Ghanem (born 1940), Emirati engineer, administrator, poet and author
 Shukri Ghanem (1942–2012), Libyan politician, former Prime Minister of Libya

See also
 Nassir Al-Ghanem (born 1961), Kuwaiti former footballer
 Nujoom Al-Ghanem (born 1962), Emirati poet, artist and film director
 Mohamed El Ghanem, Egyptian refugee detained without charge for seven years by the Geneva judiciary from 2007 to 2013
 Ganem, a given name and surname

Arabic-language surnames
Arabic masculine given names